Bentley Community School District is a public school district in Genesee County in the U.S. state of Michigan and in the Genesee Intermediate School District. It serves Belsay and Lapeer Heights Neighorhoods of the City of Burton.

References

School districts in Michigan
Education in Genesee County, Michigan